Last Train from Overbrook is an album by saxophonist James Moody recorded in 1958 and released on the Argo label.

Reception

The Allmusic site awarded the album 4½ stars.

Track listing 
All compositions by James Moody, except as indicated
 "Last Train from Overbrook" - 2:55 
 "Don't Worry 'Bout Me" (Rube Bloom, Ted Koehler) - 2:35  
 "Why Don't You?" (Johnny Pate) - 2:18 
 "What's New?" (Johnny Burke, Bob Haggart) - 3:22 
 "Tico-Tico" (Jose Abreu) - 1:37   
 "There She Goes" - 2:18   
 "All the Things You Are" (Oscar Hammerstein II, Jerome Kern) - 2:03 
 "Brother Yusef" (Pate) - 3:04
 "Yvonne" (Pate) - 3:35  
 "The Moody One" [false start] (Pate) - 0:45 
 "The Moody One" (Pate) - 2:38

Personnel 
James Moody - tenor saxophone, alto saxophone, flute
Flip Ricard, Earl Turner, Sonny Cohn - trumpet
Ethel Merker - French horn on "Last Train from Overbrook" 
John Avant - trombone
Bill Atkins, Lenny Druss - alto saxophone
 Vito Price, Sandy Mosse, Eddie Johnson - tenor saxophone
Pat Patrick - baritone saxophone
Junior Mance - piano
Floyd Morris - piano
Johnny Pate - bass
John Gray - guitar
Red Holt - drums

References 

James Moody (saxophonist) albums
1958 albums
Argo Records albums